Eddy Van Butsele (born 13 July 1947) is a Belgian middle-distance runner. He competed in the men's 3000 metres steeplechase at the 1968 Summer Olympics.

References

1947 births
Living people
Athletes (track and field) at the 1968 Summer Olympics
Belgian male middle-distance runners
Belgian male steeplechase runners
Olympic athletes of Belgium
Place of birth missing (living people)